Destination Unknown is the third album from Israeli psychedelic trance producer Vibe Tribe, released in 2009.

Summary
Following the success of the 2004 debut album Melodrama and 2006 Wise Cracks albums in the full-on psy trance scene, Destination Unknown was released in 2009. The first track incore was one of the biggest hit of this album. The second track is a remix of "The Purist" by Alien vs. The Cat vs. Shanti and the ninth one is a remix of "Frozen" by Celldweller. The album also includes four remixes of "Supernatural" by Vibe Tribe and Spade. Spade (Elmar Ivatarov) is a former member of the Vibe Tribe project, nowadays only used by Stas Marnianski.

Track listing
In Core	(7:16)	
The Purist (Vibe Tribe Remix)	(6:51)	
Japanese Heights	(8:40)	
Electrified	(6:23)	
Destination Unknown	(7:04)	
Rocket Science		(7:12)	
A Million Little Pieces	(9:16)	
No Limits	(7:17)	
Frozen (Vibe Tribe Remix)	(6:50)	
Supernatural (Ananda Shake Remix) [vs. Spade]		(7:07)	
Supernatural (Spade Remix) [vs. Spade]		(7:32)	
Supernatural (System Nipel Remix) [vs. Spade]		(8:05)	
Supernatural (Alter Breed Remix) [vs. Spade]		(9:01)

References

2009 albums
Vibe Tribe albums